Sandman is the surname of:

 Charles W. Sandman Jr. (1921–1985), American politician
 Don Sandman (1889–1973), New Zealand cricketer
 Felix Sandman (born 1998), Swedish singer, songwriter and actor
 Mark Sandman (1952–1999), American singer and co-founder of the band Morphine